Héctor Fabio Landázuri (born 20 August 1983) is a Colombian football goalkeeper currently playing for Boyacá Chicó in the Categoría Primera A.

International career
He has played for the Colombian NT and started in the 2003 Sub-20 World Cup where Colombia finished in 3rd place by beating Argentina 2–1. He was also a member of the Colombian sub-17, sub-20 and the senior Colombia national team during the friendly against Panama were Colombia won 4–0.

External links
 
 

1983 births
Living people
Colombian footballers
Categoría Primera A players
Envigado F.C. players
Once Caldas footballers
Atlético Bucaramanga footballers
La Paz F.C. players
Boyacá Chicó F.C. footballers
Colombia under-20 international footballers
Colombia international footballers
Colombian expatriate footballers
Expatriate footballers in Bolivia
Association football goalkeepers
Footballers from Cali